Goodenia brunnea is a species of flowering plant in the family Goodeniaceae and is endemic to Central Australia. It is a shrub with sticky lance-shaped or lyre-shaped leaves with toothed edges, and racemes or thyrses of yellow flowers.

Description

Taxonomy and naming
Goodenia brunnea was first formally described in 1992 by Roger Charles Carolin in the Flora of Australia from material collected in 1957.

Distribution and habitat
This goodenia grows in rocky situations and near watercourses in the far north-west of South Australia and the far south-west of the Northern Territory.

References

brunnea
Flora of South Australia
Flora of the Northern Territory
Plants described in 1992
Taxa named by Roger Charles Carolin